The National Guard Armory is a historic National Guard Armory located at Columbia, Missouri.  It was built about 1940, as a Works Progress Administration project.  The rectangular, reinforced concrete, Art Deco building sits on the north side of downtown Columbia.  Today the building is owned by the city and used as a youth recreation center.

It was listed on the National Register of Historic Places in 1993.

References

Armories on the National Register of Historic Places
Armories in Missouri
Military facilities on the National Register of Historic Places in Missouri
Works Progress Administration in Missouri
Art Deco architecture in Missouri
Buildings and structures completed in 1940
Buildings and structures in Columbia, Missouri
National Register of Historic Places in Boone County, Missouri